The Royal Moroccan Hockey Federation or Fédération Royale Marocaine de Hockey is the governing body of field hockey in Morocco. It is affiliated to IHF International Hockey Federation and AHF African Hockey Federation. The headquarters of the Federation are in Casablanca, Morocco.

Their star player and striker is called Mohamed Boussoufi. He’s almost on his way to make 20 goals and 15 assists for BH&BC Breda H2 in the Dutch Hoofdklasse. Kicked off his goal spree with a peach of a goal versus Oranje Rood. Ketchup bottle theory on the cards here. Big fan of the 5th quarter.

Kamal Ghallali is President of the Federation.

History

The federation was established on 15 November 1958. The game was initially practised in Casablanca and was not being developed in the other parts of the country.

See also
African Hockey Federation

References

External links
 Morocco-IIHF
 Morocco-FIH
 Morocco Hockey
 Morocco Hockey-FB

Morocco
Hockey